Richard Alden (born 1963) is a British entrepreneur and business executive. From 1998 to 2009, he was CEO and founding director of ONO, the largest telecommunications operator in Spain. In 2014, ONO was acquired British telecommunications company Vodafone. Until November of 2015, Alden served as chief executive officer of Wananchi Group, a fast-growing communications operator, providing DTH, cable internet and business services in East Africa. Alden is the current president of parcel delivery start-up Citibox.

Early life
Alden comes from Cowbridge in South Wales, and began his career as a chartered accounted at Deloitte, one of the “Big Four” accounting firms, where he became senior manager in audit and corporate finance in 1985.

Career

ONO 
In 1998, Alden became the founding director of Spanish cable and telecom firm ONO, and was its CEO from 2000 to 2009. The company eventually covered 70 percent of Spain's territory and had 1.9 million customers. In 2004, Alden rejected a $2.4 billion merger offer from Auna, judging that the price was too low. Alden left ONO in 2009. The company was acquired by Vodafone in 2014 for $10 billion, and the ONO brand was completely retired in early 2019.

Later career 
In 2010, Alden was appointed non-executive chairman of Mirada, a Spanish TV production firm specialising in audiovisual content interaction. That same year, he was also named president of European operations of SaaS-systems provider TOA Technologies. During that time, Virgin Media was one of TOA's main customers.

After stints at Brazil’s Blue Interactive as non-executive chairman and non-executive vice chairman of Euskaltel SA in Spain, Richard Alden joined Kenyan pay TV company Wananchi Group in 2013 as CEO, replacing previous CEO Richard Bell. Alden helped Wananchi Group increase its offer of pay TV channels beyond its traditional offer, ZUKU, to include Nickelodeon, Bloomberg, Sky News and others. He left the Group in November 2015 after which the CEO position remained vacant until 2017.

Since 2019, Alden has been the president of Madrid-based delivery start-up Citibox, which aims to make deliveries more efficient and sustainable. In June 2019, Citibox raised €11 million in order to continue national and international expansion.

Personal life 
Alden is married and divides his time between Lisbon, Madrid and Cape Town. 
After the end of his contract with Wananchi, Alden was charged with murder, following the death of Kenyan national Grace Wangechi Kinyanjui on 4 June 2016 at his Nairobi home. He pleaded not guilty to the charges, and was acquitted of all charges by the Kenyan Courts on 30 October 2017, following independent ballistics evidence that proved that Kinyanjui had mishandled a gun and accidentally shot herself. Alden had rushed her to hospital, where she later died.

References

Sunday Times, 3 December 2017, page 5, 'White Mischief' murder suspect freed after top sleuth traces bouncing bullet, Nicholas Hellen, Social Affairs Editor
The Sun onLine, 3 December 2017
The Mail on Line, 3 December 2017

Living people
Chief operating officers
British chief executives
1963 births